Stephen Ellis (13 June 1953 – 29 July 2015) was a British historian and Africanist whose research focused on post-colonial West Africa and South Africa. He was a former editor of Africa Confidential and African Affairs, a senior researcher at the African Studies Centre Leiden, and a professor at the Vrije Universiteit Amsterdam.

Life and career 
Ellis was born in Nottingham, England on 13 June 1953. At the age of 18, he volunteered as a secondary school teacher in Douala, Cameroon. Upon his return to England, he studied modern history at St. Catherine's College, University of Oxford and obtained his doctorate there in 1981. In 1979 and 1980, he was a lecturer at the University of Madagascar, while conducting research for his doctoral thesis on the history of Madagascar. Parts of his thesis became the basis for his first book, published as Rising of the Red Shawls (1985), about the Menalamba rebellion in colonial Madagascar. While writing the book, between 1982 and 1986, he was head of the Africa sub-region at the International Secretariat of Amnesty International in London. Ellis then served as editor of the Africa Confidential newsletter for five years, from 1986 to 1991. 

Between 1991 and 1994, Ellis was General Secretary and then Director of the African Studies Centre at Leiden University in the Netherlands. He remained a senior researcher at Leiden until his death, but after 1994 left his administrative role, first to take up an assignment for the Dutch Ministry of Foreign Affairs at the Global Coalition for Africa, which resulted in his next book, Africa Now (1996). From 1997 to 1998, he was a researcher for the South African Truth and Reconciliation Commission. He was appointed editor of journal of the British Royal African Society, African Affairs, in 1998, and retained that position until 2006. In 1999, he published, with Jean-François Bayart and Béatrice Hibou, The Criminalization of the State in Africa, a study of the interaction between privatisation and post-colonial patronage institutions in Africa. 

From 2003 to 2004, Ellis was Director of the Africa program of the International Crisis Group, where he expanded the group's reporting on Nigeria and South Africa. In 2008, he was invited to act as an expert witness at the opening of Liberian President Charles Taylor's trial at the Special Court for Sierra Leone in the Hague, and then to give expert testimony at the Sierra Leonean Truth and Reconciliation Commission. The same year, he was appointed Desmond Tutu Professor of Youth, Sport and Reconciliation at the Vrije Universiteit in Amsterdam, where he worked until his death. In 2013, Ellis won the Recht Malan Prize for External Mission: The ANC in Exile (2012), his second book about the South Africa's African National Congress (ANC). He was an advisor to the West Africa Commission on Drugs, chaired by former Nigerian President Olusegun Obasanjo, in 2013 and 2014.

Ellis was married to fellow Africanist Gerrie ter Haar. He died on 29 July 2015 in his home in Amsterdam, having been diagnosed with leukaemia three years earlier. His last book, This Present Darkness (2016), was published posthumously and studies the nature and origins of organised crime in Nigeria. In 2019, Ellis's professional archive was donated to the African Studies Centre in Leiden.

Controversies

South Africa 
While at Africa Confidential, Ellis reported the first accounts of mutinies in the Angolan camps of Umkhonto we Sizwe, the armed wing of the South African ANC, as well as a detailed account of the detention of Pallo Jordan by the ANC's internal security wing, Mbokodo. These reports were elaborated in Ellis's Comrades against Apartheid: The ANC and the South African Communist Party in Exile (1992), which was co-authored by Oyama Mabandla (under the pseudonym Tsepo Sechaba), a former member of Mbokodo and of the South African Communist Party (SACP) in exile. The book was unpopular with the ANC for its account of abuses in the exile camps, but many of Ellis's allegations were later confirmed in the final report of the Truth and Reconciliation Commission. Ellis's External Mission (2012) was also about the ANC in exile and revisited earlier themes, particularly concerning the ANC's intimacy with the SACP. The book also claimed to provide evidence for the long-controversial claim that former South African President Nelson Mandela had been a member of the Central Committee of the SACP. This ignited heated debate, but Ellis's claim about Mandela was ultimately confirmed true by the SACP itself, following Mandela's death in 2013.

Liberia 
Ellis's The Mask of Anarchy (2001), about the Liberian civil war, was shortlisted for the African Studies Association's Herskovits Award, but caused a minor scandal in West Africa when newspapers reported on the book's claim that Liberian warlord Charles Taylor engaged in ritual cannibalism. Some commentators labelled the book racist; and Taylor, then Liberian President, sued Ellis in a London court, but later withdrew the charges. Equally controversial, Ellis's later published an article in Foreign Affairs, entitled "How to Rebuild Africa", which construed Liberia as a prime example of a "failed state" in Africa and argued that such states should be brought under a new form of international trusteeship.

Selected publications 
 The Rising of the Red Shawls: A Revolt in Madagascar, 1895–1899. Cambridge: Cambridge University Press. 1985. .
 Un complot colonial à Madagascar: l'affaire Rainandriamampandry (in French). Karthala Editions. 1990. .
 Comrades Against Apartheid: The ANC and the South African Communist Party in Exile (with Tsepo Sechaba). London: James Currey. 1992. .
 Africa Now: People, Policies and Institutions. The Hague: Netherlands Ministry of Foreign Affairs. 1996. .
 The Criminalization of the State in Africa (with Jean-François Bayart and Béatrice Hibou). London: James Currey. 1999. .
 The Mask of Anarchy: The Destruction of Liberia and the Religious Dimension of an African Civil War. London: Hurst & Company. 2001. .
 Worlds of Power: Religious Thought and Political Practice in Africa (with Gerrie ter Haar). New York: Oxford University Press. 2004. .
 "West Africa's International Drug Trade". African Affairs. 108 (431): 171–196. 2009. .
 Season of Rains: Africa in the World (2012). Chicago: University of Chicago Press. .
 External Mission: The ANC in Exile, 1960–1990. London: Hurst & Company. 2012. .
 This Present Darkness: A History of Nigerian Organised Crime. London: Hurst & Company. 2016. . 
 Charlatans, Spirits and Rebels in Africa: The Stephen Ellis Reader. London: Hurst & Company. 2020. .

See also 
 History of the African National Congress

Notes

External links 

 Open access publications by Stephen Ellis
 Stephen Ellis bibliography (2nd edition, 2018)

Historians of Africa
Historians of South Africa
Historians of the United Kingdom
British Africanists
Academic staff of Vrije Universiteit Amsterdam
British human rights activists
1953 births
2015 deaths